The 2015 Arab Athletics Championships was the nineteenth edition of the international athletics competition between Arab countries that took place from 24–27 April 2015 at Khalifa Sports City Stadium in Isa Town, close to Manama, the capital of Bahrain. Around 700 athletes from 21 nations attended the event, which was directed by Bahrain's Bader Nasser. The event mascot was an anthropomorphic bird of prey.

A series of grand prix track and field meetings were organised by the Arab Athletics Federation in order to promote qualification for the event.

Medal summary

Men

Women

Medal table
Key

References

ALGÉRIE AU 19 EME. CHAMPIONNAT PANARABES D’ATHLÉTISME BAHREÏN / MANAMA 24 - 27/04/2015 (archived). Algeria Athletics Stats. Retrieved on 2015-05-04.

External links
Official website (archived)

Arab Athletics Championships
International athletics competitions hosted by Bahrain
Sport in Manama
Arab Athletics Championships
Arab Athletics Championships
21st century in Manama
International sports competitions hosted by Bahrain
April 2015 sports events in Asia